The following highways are numbered 295:

Canada
 Quebec Route 295

Japan
 Japan National Route 295

United States
  Interstate 295 (multiple highways)
  U.S. Route 295 (former)
  Alabama State Route 295
  Arkansas Highway 295
  Arkansas Highway 295 Spur (former)
  District of Columbia Route 295
  Florida State Road 295
  Florida State Road 295 Spur
  Georgia State Route 295 (former)
  Maryland Route 295
  Massachusetts Route 295
  Minnesota State Highway 295
  Montana Secondary Highway 295
  New York State Route 295
  North Carolina Highway 295
  Ohio State Route 295
  Pennsylvania Route 295 (former)
  South Carolina Highway 295
  Tennessee State Route 295
 Texas:
  Texas State Highway 295 (former)
  Farm to Market Road 295
  Utah State Route 295 (former)
  Wyoming Highway 295